Miss America 1953, the 26th Miss America pageant, was held at the Boardwalk Hall in Atlantic City, New Jersey on September 6, 1952.

Neva Jane Langley became the first Miss Georgia to win the crown.

Results

Awards

Preliminary awards

Other awards

Contestants

References

External links
 Miss America official website

1953
1952 in the United States
1953 beauty pageants
1952 in New Jersey
September 1952 events in the United States
Events in Atlantic City, New Jersey